April Showers may refer to;

 April shower, spring rain in parts of the northern hemisphere, particularly the United Kingdom 
 "April Showers" (song), 1921 popular song
 April Showers (1923 film), American silent romantic film directed by Tom Forman
 April Showers (1948 film), American musical film directed by James V. Kern
 April Showers (2009 film), American independent drama film directed by Andrew Robinson
 April Showers (mixtape), 2013 mixtape by Wyclef Jean
 April's Shower, 2006 romantic film

See also
 "Little April Shower", a song from the 1942 Disney film Bambi